Thomas Edward Weber (born September 27, 1987) is a former American football placekicker. He was signed by the Cincinnati Bengals as an undrafted free agent in 2011. He played college football for the Arizona State Sun Devils.

College career
Weber won the Lou Groza Award for the nation's top kicker following the 2007 season, in which he made 24-of-25 field goals and 46-of-48 extra point attempts.

Professional career

Cincinnati Bengals
Weber signed with the Cincinnati Bengals as an undrafted free agent prior to the 2011 season on July 28, 2011. He was waived during final roster cuts on September 3, 2011. He re-signed with the team on January 6, 2012, but he was waived again on August 17, 2012.

References

External links
Arizona State Sun Devils football bio

1987 births
American football placekickers
Arizona State Sun Devils football players
Living people
Cincinnati Bengals players